Ramdurg State was one of the Maratha princely states ruled by the Bhave family during the British Raj. It was administered as part of the Deccan States Agency of the Bombay Presidency, founded in 1799. It was one of the former states of the Southern Maratha Country and its capital was at Ramdurg.

Ramdurg State measured 438 square kilometers in area. According to the 1901 census, the population was 37,848.

History
The foundation of the state dates back to 1742 when Ramdurg State was separated from Nargund.
During Hyder Ali and Tipu Sultan's time, between 1785 and 1799, Ramdurg was occupied by the Kingdom of Mysore. In 1827 - 1829 Ramdurg State came under the British India administration.

Ramdurg acceded to the Dominion of India on 8 March 1948 and is currently a part of Karnataka state.

Rulers
The rulers of Ramdurg State were Hindu and belonged to the  Chitpavan Brahmin caste with the surname Bhave. The Diwan or Regent of the state belonged to another Chitpavan Brahmin family with surname Ranade. The rulers from Bhave family used the title of Raja.

Rajas
1742 - 1777                Yogirao I Bhave
1777 - 1785                Ramrao I Bhave                     (d. 1800)
1785 - 1799                occupied by Mahisur (Mysore)
1800 - 1810                Bapurao Ranade -Regent
1810 - 1827                Narayanrao I Ramrao "Appa Saheb Bhave"                           (d. 1827)
1827 - 1829                British administration
1829 - 1857                Rani Radhabai (f)                  (d. 1857)
1857 - 1872                Ramrao II Narayanrao Bhave
1872 - 1878                Yogirao II "Bapu Saheb" Bhave      (b. 1852 - d. 1878)
11 Feb 1878 - 1907         Vyankatrao Yogirao Bhave           (b. 1877 - d. 1907)
30 Apr 1907 - 1947         Ramrao III Vyankatrao Rao Saheb Bhave   (b. 1896 - d. 19..)

Gallery

See also
 List of Maratha dynasties and states
 Political integration of India

References

Princely states of India
Bombay Presidency
History of Karnataka
Belagavi district
1742 establishments in India